Stuart Andrew Searle (born 27 February 1979) is an English football manager and former player who played as a goalkeeper. He is currently the goalkeeping coach of Chelsea Women.

Club career
Born in Wimbledon, London, Searle joined Premier League team Chelsea from Basingstoke Town as back-up for their reserve team and as a player-coach, before working there part-time.

He moved to Championship team Watford in January 2009, which re-united him with former Chelsea reserve team manager Brendan Rodgers, who had been appointed as Watford manager in November 2008. In July 2009 his contract at Watford was cancelled by mutual consent and he subsequently signed a two-year contract with League One team Milton Keynes Dons.

Stuart made his long-awaited Football League debut in 2010 against Bristol Rovers at the Memorial Stadium. He remained at MK Dons in 2010–11, making a start against Yeovil Town in a 3–2 win. However, after MK Dons' loss to Peterborough in the N-Power League play-off semi-final he was released along with three other players.

Management career
While still a player, Searle began coaching in various roles at Chelsea, including a two-year stint as player-coach for Chelsea Reserves.

After retiring from playing, Searle joined Guildford City as assistant manager in 2015.

Since 2012, Searle has been the goalkeeping coach at Chelsea Women.

References

External links
 
 
 Stuart Searle at Chelsea FC

1979 births
Living people
Footballers from Wimbledon, London
English footballers
Association football goalkeepers
Woking F.C. players
Crawley Town F.C. players
Aldershot Town F.C. players
Molesey F.C. players
Carshalton Athletic F.C. players
Basingstoke Town F.C. players
Chelsea F.C. players
Watford F.C. players
Milton Keynes Dons F.C. players
Chelmsford City F.C. players
Metropolitan Police F.C. players
English Football League players
Watford F.C. non-playing staff
Chelsea F.C. non-playing staff